Nordia Inc. was created in 1999 as a joint partnership between two North American companies in communications and customer relationship management: Excell Global Services and Bell Canada. This happened after Bell Canada decided to stop processing calls for directory assistance. Bell has since bought out Excell's share in the company, making it a fully owned Bell subsidiary. Montreal-based Nordia contracts employees in Moncton, Saint John, Quebec City, Laval, Sherbrooke, Saguenay, Waterloo, Orillia, Peterborough, and Nanaimo's call centres for a total of over 5000 people.

In May 2015, Bell sold Nordia to Birch Hill Equity. However Bell continues to employ Nordia as its primary call center in Canada.

References 

Telecommunications companies of Canada